The Scottish League Cup is a knockout cup competition in Scottish football, organised by the Scottish Professional Football League (SPFL). It is considered to be the second most important domestic cup competition in Scottish football, after the Scottish Cup. The competition is open to all 42 members of the SPFL as well as invited sides from the Highland League and Lowland League.

The competition was established in 1947, the format was taken from the Southern League Cup which operated as a regional tournament (national for its last season) during World War II. The Scottish League Cup was formed, operated by and named after the Scottish Football League (SFL), who continued to operate it after the top division clubs formed the Scottish Premier League (SPL) in 1998. The competition is now organised by the SPFL, the body formed by the merger of the SPL and SFL in 2013.

Rangers hold the record for most wins with 27, while Celtic are second with 21 victories. Those two clubs share the record for the most final appearances with 36. The cup is currently held by Celtic, who defeated Rangers in the February 2023 final.

Finals

Before 1981, a draw in the final (after extra time) resulted in the match being replayed at a later date. Since the 1981 Final, the result has always been decided on the day, with a penalty shootout if required after extra time.

Key

Results

Performance by club

Performance by city / town

See also
 List of Scottish football champions 
 List of Scottish Cup finals

Notes

References

External links
 Scotland - List of League Cup Finals

 
Winners
League Cup Finals
Annual events in Glasgow
Scottish League Cup